V. P. Balasubramanian is an Indian senior politician of the Anna Dravida Munnetra Kazhagam. He served as Member of the Legislative Assembly of Tamil Nadu from 1980 to 1988 representing Vedasandur Assembly constituency, and Deputy speaker of Tamil Nadu Legislative Assembly from 1985 to 1988.

References

All India Anna Dravida Munnetra Kazhagam politicians
Deputy Speakers of the Tamil Nadu Legislative Assembly
Vokkaliga politicians
1946 births
Possibly living people
Tamil Nadu MLAs 1985–1989